is a train station in the town of Mihama, Chita District, Aichi Prefecture, Japan, operated by Meitetsu.

Lines

Station layout

Kōwa Station has a bay platform with two platforms serving four tracks. The station has automated ticket machines, Manaca automated turnstiles and is staffed.

Platforms

Adjacent stations

Station history
Kōwa Station was opened on August 1, 1935 as a station on the Chita Railway. The Chita Railway became part of the Meitetsu system on February 1, 1943.  A new station building was completed in March 1979. In 2006, the Tranpass system of magnetic fare cards with automatic turnstiles was implemented.

Other Transportation

Bus routes

Lanes
Ferry terminal is close to this station, and the walk takes 5 minutes, what is more, free shuttle buses operated by Chita Noriai bound for Port of Kowa depart from this station.
Port of Kowa
Meitetsu Kaijō Ferry bound for Cape Irago via Himakajima・Shinojima from Port of Kowa. At Port of Irago which is located near Cape Irago the last ferry board, passengers are able to change ferries operated by Isewan Ferry. This Ferry bound for Nakanogō Station (Near Toba Aquarium).

Passenger statistics
In fiscal 2018, the station was used by an average of 2171 passengers daily.

Surrounding area
Mihama Town Hall
Japan National Route 247

See also
 List of Railway Stations in Japan

References

External links

 Official web page 

Railway stations in Japan opened in 1932
Railway stations in Aichi Prefecture
Stations of Nagoya Railroad
Mihama, Aichi